Mughiphantes is a genus of dwarf spiders that was first described by Michael I. Saaristo & A. V. Tanasevitch in 1999.

Species
 it contains sixty species:
M. aculifer (Tanasevitch, 1988) – Russia
M. afghanus (Denis, 1958) – Afghanistan
M. alticola (Tanasevitch, 1987) – Nepal
M. anachoretus (Tanasevitch, 1987) – Nepal
M. ancoriformis (Tanasevitch, 1987) – Nepal
M. arlaudi (Denis, 1954) – France
M. armatus (Kulczyński, 1905) – Central Europe
M. baebleri (Lessert, 1910) – Alps (France, Italy, Switzerland, Austria, Slovenia)
M. beishanensis Tanasevitch, 2006 – China
M. bicornis Tanasevitch & Saaristo, 2006 – Nepal
M. brunneri (Thaler, 1984) – Italy
M. carnicus (van Helsdingen, 1982) – Italy
M. cornutus (Schenkel, 1927) – Europe, Turkey, Russia (Europe to South Siberia), Kazakhstan
M. cuspidatus Tanasevitch & Saaristo, 2006 – Nepal
M. edentulus Tanasevitch, 2010 – United Arab Emirates
M. falxus Tanasevitch & Saaristo, 2006 – Nepal
M. faustus (Tanasevitch, 1987) – Nepal
M. hadzii (Miller & Polenec, 1975) – Austria, Slovenia
M. handschini (Schenkel, 1919) – Central Europe
M. hindukuschensis (Miller & Buchar, 1972) – Afghanistan
M. ignavus (Simon, 1884) – France
M. inermus Tanasevitch & Saaristo, 2006 – Nepal
M. jaegeri Tanasevitch, 2006 – China
M. johannislupi (Denis, 1953) – France
M. jugorum (Denis, 1954) – France
M. lithoclasicola (Deltshev, 1983) – Bulgaria
M. logunovi Tanasevitch, 2000 – Russia
M. longiproper Tanasevitch & Saaristo, 2006 – Nepal
M. martensi Tanasevitch, 2006 – China
M. marusiki (Tanasevitch, 1988) – Russia, Mongolia
M. merretti (Millidge, 1975) – Italy
M. mughi (Fickert, 1875) (type) – Europe, Russia
M. nigromaculatus (Zhu & Wen, 1983) – Russia, China
M. numilionis (Tanasevitch, 1987) – Nepal
M. occultus (Tanasevitch, 1987) – Nepal
M. omega (Denis, 1952) – Romania
M. ovtchinnikovi (Tanasevitch, 1989) – Kyrgyzstan
M. pulcher (Kulczyński, 1881) – Central Europe
M. pulcheroides (Wunderlich, 1985) – Italy
M. pyrenaeus (Denis, 1953) – France
M. restrictus Tanasevitch & Saaristo, 2006 – Nepal
M. rotundatus (Tanasevitch, 1987) – Nepal
M. rupium (Thaler, 1984) – Germany, Austria
M. setifer (Tanasevitch, 1987) – Nepal
M. setosus Tanasevitch & Saaristo, 2006 – Nepal
M. severus (Thaler, 1990) – Austria
M. sherpa (Tanasevitch, 1987) – Nepal
M. sobrioides Tanasevitch, 2000 – Russia
M. sobrius (Thorell, 1871) – Norway (Svalbard), Russia (Europe, Siberia)
M. styriacus (Thaler, 1984) – Austria
M. suffusus (Strand, 1901) – Scandinavia, Russia
M. taczanowskii (O. Pickard-Cambridge, 1873) – Russia, Mongolia
M. tienschangensis (Tanasevitch, 1986) – Central Asia
M. triglavensis (Miller & Polenec, 1975) – Austria, Slovenia
M. variabilis (Kulczyński, 1887) – Central Europe
M. varians (Kulczyński, 1882) – Eastern Europe
M. vittatus (Spassky, 1941) – Central Asia
M. whymperi (F. O. Pickard-Cambridge, 1894) – Ireland, Britain, Scandinavia, Russia
M. yadongensis (Hu, 2001) – China
M. yeti (Tanasevitch, 1987) – Nepal

See also
 List of Linyphiidae species (I–P)

References

Araneomorphae genera
Linyphiidae
Spiders of Asia